is a Japanese field hockey player, who plays as a forward.

Career

Australian leagues
In 2018, Kazuma Murata was signed to the Canberra Lakers as an import player for the 2018 edition of the Australian Hockey League.

Following his appearance for the Canberra Lakers, Murata was signed to the Australian Capital Territory's new team, the Canberra Chill, for the inaugural tournament of the Sultana Bran Hockey One League.

National team
Murata made his debut for the Japanese national team in 2014, during a test series against New Zealand in Wellington.

He won his first medal at a major tournament in 2018, at the Asian Games in Jakarta. The team won gold, and also secured qualification to the 2020 Summer Olympics in Tokyo.

References

External links
 
 
 
 

1991 births
Japanese male field hockey players
Living people
Male field hockey forwards
Field hockey players at the 2018 Asian Games
Asian Games medalists in field hockey
Field hockey players at the 2020 Summer Olympics
Olympic field hockey players of Japan
Medalists at the 2018 Asian Games
Asian Games gold medalists for Japan
Expatriate field hockey players
Japanese expatriate sportspeople in Australia
Sportspeople from Toyama Prefecture
21st-century Japanese people